The Hofje van Noblet is a hofje in Haarlem, Netherlands.

History

It was built in 1761 from the legacy of Leonard Noblet and his sisters Sara en Geertruida. The houses in the hofje are built in the garden of the house of the Noblet family, Haerlem en Spaargesigt. The father of Leonard, Elezar Noblet, bought it in 1737. The Noblet family originally came from Amsterdam. Because Leonard, Sara and Geertruida had no legal heirs, they decided to construct a common last will. They wrote that they wanted to found a hofje, and that the governors of the nearby Hofje van Staats would be the executors of their will.

The hofje was built with 20 houses. Ten for women from Haarlem, on the east-side of the hof, and ten for women from Amsterdam, at the west-side. The women living there had to be at least 50 years old, had to have been single their whole life and had to have been a member of the Nederduits Gereformeerde Kerk, an old name of the Dutch Reformed Church.

A part of the original house of the Noblet family serves as the house of the supervisor of the hofje, another part is the official housing of the governors (regents) of the hofje (who are also the governors of the Hofje van Staats).

The main entrance of the hofje is located on the Nieuwe Gracht overlooking the Spaarne river and there is a back entrance on the Parklaan. When the hofje was built that was not called the Parklaan, but 'Achter Nieuwe Gracht', a canal. The entrance to the old house of the Noblet family is located on the Hooimarkt. An original drawing of the Hofje van Staats, as well as items from that hofje's history, are located in the hall and regent's room of the Hofje van Noblet, whose finances are also managed by the same "Foundation for the preservation of the Hofjes Staats and Noblet".Above the doorway to the Regent's room, a board with the list of names of the regents hangs with the dates of their appointment, which are also the dates of their oval portraits that hang in the two front rooms.

List of regents and their portraits

The hofje was renovated in 1992, when the number of houses was reduced from 20 to 16 to allow for modern living requirements.

Address: Nieuwe Gracht 2

References

 Haarlems hofjes, Dr. G. H. Kurtz, Schuyt & Co C.V., Haarlem, 1972, 
 Door gangen en poorten naar de hofjes van Haarlem, L. Peetorn and L. van der Hoek, Stichting Uitgeverij Barabinsk Leiden, 2001, 

Hofjes
1761 establishments in Europe
Rijksmonuments in Haarlem